Alexandre Gomes Felipe (born 30 March 1999), known as Alexandre Tam, is a Brazilian footballer who as either an attacking midfielder or a forward for Criciúma.

Club career
Born in Guarujá, São Paulo, Alexandre Tam joined Santos' youth setup in 2011, aged 11, from SE Itapema. In February 2016, he signed his first professional contract with the club, until 2019.

Alexandre Tam was promoted to the first team by manager Jorge Sampaoli in June 2019, and signed a new contract until 2022 on 19 June. On 3 September 2020, he moved to Série B side Confiança on loan until the end of the season.

Alexandre Tam made his professional debut on 30 September 2020, coming on as a half-time substitute for Everton in a 1–1 home draw against Brasil de Pelotas. He returned to Santos in February 2021, after playing six league matches for Confiança, but remained unused and rescinded his contract on 12 April 2022.

Career statistics

References

External links

1999 births
Living people
People from Guarujá
Footballers from São Paulo (state)
Brazilian footballers
Association football midfielders
Association football forwards
Campeonato Brasileiro Série B players
Santos FC players
Associação Desportiva Confiança players
Criciúma Esporte Clube players